Andre Barreau is a British former member of The Bootleg Beatles, in which he played George Harrison from March 1980, when the group was formed, until 2014.

The Bootleg Beatles
Following the final show of the West End musical Beatlemania, Barreau formed The Bootleg Beatles with fellow cast members Neil Harrison and David Catlin-Birch.  The band invested their dwindling finances in two guitars – an Epiphone and a Gretsch – as well as two Vox amplifiers, four black polo-necks and a wig.

Credits

Stage
 Beatlemania (1979–1980) – George Harrison
 The Bootleg Beatles (1980–2014) – George Harrison, Audio Visual Research and Artistic Director

Discography
 Le Beat Group Electrique, album by Wreckless Eric (1989) – Bass guitar
 "Angels," song by Robbie Williams (1997) – Lead guitar
 "Call Me a Fool" on the original soundtrack for Sliding Doors (1998)
 As I Was Saying, album by John Howard (2005) – Guitars
 Same Bed, Different Dreams, album by John Howard (2006) – Guitars
 Dangerous Parking (2007) – Composer

References

Year of birth missing (living people)
Living people
British male guitarists
The Bootleg Beatles members